Alejandro "Álex" Castro Martín (born 20 December 1974) is a Spanish former footballer who played as a midfielder.

Club career
Born in Las Palmas, Castro spent the vast majority of his professional career in his native Canary Islands. He made his professional debut with UD Las Palmas, coming on as a second-half substitute in a 4–2 home win against Levante UD on 17 May 1997 in the Segunda División. His only other appearance of the season was on 15 June, as he played the entirety of the 3–0 away victory over CD Toledo.

From 1998 to 2000 Castro contributed 56 league appearances, including 31 in the latter campaign to help his team to promote to La Liga as champions. His first and only game in the top flight occurred on 1 October 2000, 27 minutes into a 5–1 away loss to Valencia CF. In January of the following year, he was loaned to neighbouring CD Tenerife of the second division, joining in the same situation fellow league club CD Numancia roughly one year later.

Castro subsequently returned to Las Palmas, being relegated from the second tier in 2004. He retired in June 2009 at the age of 34, after spells in the Segunda División B with Castillo CF, CD San Isidro and UD Villa de Santa Brígida.

Personal life
Castro was one of five brothers, of which Guillermo and Rubén were also footballers. All three came through at their hometown club, with the youngest enjoying his greatest success at Real Betis.

References

External links

1974 births
Living people
Spanish footballers
Footballers from Las Palmas
Association football midfielders
La Liga players
Segunda División players
Segunda División B players
Tercera División players
UD Las Palmas players
CD Tenerife players
CD Numancia players